Fatiha Berber (1945–2015) was an Algerian actress for theater, cinema and television, whose real name was Fatiha Blal.

Life
Fatiha Berber was born in the Casbah of Algiers. Her family came from Legata in the Boumerdès Province of Northern Algeria.

In the late 1950s she sang with the orchestra of Meriem Fekkaï, before studying drama at the Conservatory of Algiers. The director Mustapha Gribi gave her her first role, in an adaptation of Molière, Les femmes savantes. She took part in Algeria's National Liberation struggle.

She died on 16 January 2015 in Paris, following a heart attack.

Works

Films
 Hassan Taxi, dir. Mohamed Slim Riad, 1982
 Aila Ki Nass, dir. Amar Tribeche, 1990
 Le démon au féminin [Woman as the Devil], dir. Hafsa Zinaï Koudil, 1994
 Rai, dir. Thomas Gilou, 1995
 Prima del tramonto [Before Sunset], dir. Stefano Incerti, 1999
 Aïd el-Kébir, dir. Karin Albou, 1999

Television series
 El Masir [Destiny]
 El la'ib [The Player], 2004
 El Badra [The Seed], 2008–10

References

External links
 

1945 births
2015 deaths
People from Casbah
Algerian film actresses
Algerian stage actresses
Algerian television actresses
21st-century Algerian people